Helsinge-Hallen is an indoor sports arena in Helsinge, Denmark, primarily used for handball. The arena can hold 1,600 spectators and is home to Danish Handball League team Nordsjælland Håndbold.

External links
 Helsinge-Hallerne

Handball venues in Denmark
Indoor arenas in Denmark